Paolo Valdagno (16th century) was an Italian physician from Verona.

Biography
His biographical history was written by the Brescian physician Girolamo Donzellini.
Among Valdagno's works are:
De Theriacae usu in Febribus pestilentibus (1570) Brescia
De mixtione Dialogi Duo (1562) Basil
Proclo del moto
Die Quaestiones medicae, (1568) PaviaEudoxi Philalethis Apologia'' (1573) Verona

References 

Date of birth unknown
Date of death unknown
17th-century Italian physicians
People from Verona